A Illa de Arousa is the only island municipality in Galicia, Spain in the province of Pontevedra. It is located in the heart of the Ria de Arousa. According to 2021 INE the island's population was 4,951 inhabitants. The population is divided into several neighborhoods, and places of interest are the lighthouse's environment, the island of Areoso (close to the Illa de Arousa) and Carreirón Natural Park, which is listed as a special protection zone for heron birds populations among other birds that inhabit the island. The Holy viewpoint is the highest point on the island. 
"San Xulián da Illa de Arousa" is the only parish in this island. Some of its beaches are the following ones: A Area da Secada, A Lavanqueira, O Vao, Camaxe, Carreirón, Espiñeiro and O Cabodeiro.

A Illa de Arousa has five ports. Xufre is the most important and the other important docks include O Campo, Chazo and Cabodeiro.

Etymology 
According to E. Bascuas, "Arousa", registered as insulam Arauza in 899, would belong to the old European hydronymy, and is derived from the Indoeuropean  root *er- 'flow, move'.

See also 

 List of islands of Spain
 IGAFA

References

External links
Concello da Illa de Arousa Townhall of Arousa Island
Arousa
A Illa de Arousa - Paraíso Natural en Galicia

Municipalities in the Province of Pontevedra
Islands of Galicia (Spain)